Charles "Charlie" Sampson (born July 2, 1957) is an American former professional rodeo cowboy who specialized in bull riding. He was the 1982 Professional Rodeo Cowboys Association (PRCA) World Champion bull rider. He is the first African American cowboy to win a world championship in professional rodeo. He was inducted into the ProRodeo Hall of Fame in 1996.

Early life 
Sampson was born in Los Angeles, California on July 2, 1957. To avoid the violence that surrounded him as a boy, he took a job at a riding stables near Gardena, California. There he sparked an interest in horses and rodeo. He was a fan of the famous African-American bull rider, Myrtis Dightman, who was known as the "Jackie Robinson of Rodeo".

Career 
Sampson stands 5 feet, 4 inches tall. He was a ground breaking rodeo cowboy. He was the first Afro-American to win a world title in the PRCA. In 1983, there were only six black members of the PRCA. Sampson was competing on a national level. Sampson very rarely mentioned race as an issue, even though he was competing in a sport dominated by white competitors. Sampson once said in The New York Times, "I haven't encountered discrimination as much as ignorance. Some people still don't realize that something like a quarter of all the cowboys back in the old West were black."

Injuries
He is known for his many injuries as well. Sampson's left calf has 17 pins and two metal plates. In the New York Times Magazine, Sampson noted, "In 1983, a bull jerked me down and cracked my skull--I broke every bone in my face except my nose. I broke my ankle, my leg, my sternum, my wrist. In '88, I had an ear ripped off when a bull ran over me and his foot caught my hat." He shattered his face in a riding accident in front of Ronald Reagan. His PRCA career lasted almost 20 years, with 11 National Finals Rodeo (NFR) trips.

Retirement 
He retired after the National Circuit Finals Rodeo in Pocatello, Idaho, in 1994. He spent his retirement doing ads for companies like Wrangler Jeans and Timex. In 1996, he was inducted into the ProRodeo Hall of Fame.

Wins and awards 
 PRCA World Champion bull rider, 1982
 PRCA Sierra Circuit bull riding champion, 1984
 Turquoise Circuit bull riding champion, 1985–86 and 1993.
 Copenhagen/Skoal bull riding champion, 1992
 Calgary Stampede $50,000 bonus round bull riding champion
 2-time bull riding champion at Pendleton Round-Up
 2-time Grand National Rodeo (Cow Palace) champion
 2-time bull riding champion at California Rodeo Salinas
 3-time champion of George Paul Memorial Bull Riding in Del Rio, Texas
 Rodeo Superstars Champion bull rider

Honors 
 2019 Bull Riding Hall of Fame
 2009 Ellensburg Rodeo Hall of Fame
 2008 Rodeo Hall of Fame of the National Cowboy and Western Heritage Museum
 2004 PBR Ring of Honor 
 2003 National Multicultural Western Heritage Museum and Hall of Fame
 1996 ProRodeo Hall of Fame

Personal life
Sampson attended Central Arizona College. He married Marilyn Casmon in 1984. Casmon hailed from Big Spring, Texas. The Sampsons had two sons: Laurence Charles who was born in 1984, and Daniel Carl who was born in 1988. They made their home in Aurora, Colorado.

References

1957 births
Living people
Sportspeople from Los Angeles
African-American sportsmen
Bull riders
ProRodeo Hall of Fame inductees
Professional Bull Riders: Heroes and Legends
21st-century African-American people
20th-century African-American sportspeople